In mathematics, the Pincherle derivative  of a linear operator  on the vector space of polynomials in the variable x over a field  is the commutator of  with the multiplication by x in the algebra of endomorphisms . That is,  is another linear operator 

(for the origin of the  notation, see the article on the adjoint representation) so that 

This concept is named after the Italian mathematician Salvatore Pincherle (1853–1936).

Properties 
The Pincherle derivative, like any commutator, is a derivation, meaning it satisfies the sum and products rules: given two linear operators  and  belonging to 

;
 where  is the composition of operators.

One also has  where  is the usual Lie bracket, which follows from the Jacobi identity.

The usual derivative, D = d/dx, is an operator on polynomials. By straightforward computation, its Pincherle derivative is

 

This formula generalizes to

 

by induction. This proves that the Pincherle derivative of a differential operator

 

When  has characteristic zero, the shift operator

 

can be written as

 

by the Taylor formula. Its Pincherle derivative is then

 

In other words, the shift operators are eigenvectors of the Pincherle derivative, whose spectrum is the whole space of scalars .

The "discrete-time delta operator"

 

is the operator

 

whose Pincherle derivative is the shift operator .

See also 
Commutator
Delta operator
Umbral calculus

References

External links 
Weisstein, Eric W. "Pincherle Derivative". From MathWorld—A Wolfram Web Resource.
Biography of Salvatore Pincherle at the MacTutor History of Mathematics archive.

Differential algebra